Jean Damascène Bimenyimana (22 June 1953 – 11 March 2018) was a Roman Catholic bishop.

Bimenyimana was ordained to the priesthood in 1980. He served as bishop of the Roman Catholic Diocese of Cyangugu, Rwanda, from 1997 until his death.

Notes

1953 births
2018 deaths
20th-century Roman Catholic bishops in Rwanda
21st-century Roman Catholic bishops in Rwanda
Rwandan Roman Catholic bishops
Roman Catholic bishops of Cyangugu